Spectralia is a genus of beetles in the family Buprestidae, containing the following species:

 Spectralia aequalis (Waterhouse, 1889)
 Spectralia albonotata (Laporte & Gory, 1837)
 Spectralia arcuata (Laporte & Gory, 1837)
 Spectralia bahamica (Cazier, 1952)
 Spectralia carinata (Silbermann, 1838)
 Spectralia costulata (Laporte & Gory, 1837)
 Spectralia costulifera (Chevrolat, 1867)
 Spectralia cuprescens (Knull, 1940)
 Spectralia frontalis (Waterhouse, 1882)
 Spectralia gracilipes (Melsheimer, 1845)
 Spectralia maculatissima (Thomson, 1879)
 Spectralia multipunctata (Olivier, 1790)
 Spectralia nelsoni Westcott, 2006
 Spectralia parafrontalis (Nelson, 1971)
 Spectralia prosternalis (Schaeffer, 1904)
 Spectralia purpurascens (Schaeffer, 1905)
 Spectralia roburella (Knull, 1941)
 Spectralia robusta (Chamberlin, 1920)
 Spectralia sulcicollis (Chevrolat, 1867)
 Spectralia sulcifera (Laporte & Gory, 1837)
 Spectralia uniformis (Waterhouse, 1889)
 Spectralia viridipunctata (Thomson, 1879)

References

Buprestidae genera